The Salisbury, MD-DE Metropolitan Statistical Area is a United States Census Bureau-designated metropolitan area centered in and around Salisbury, Maryland, including four counties: Somerset, Wicomico, and Worcester in Maryland; and Sussex in Delaware. 

The metropolitan area had a population of 423,481 residents as of the 2020 census. The U.S. Census Bureau defines the Salisbury-Cambridge, MD-DE Combined Statistical Area, which combines the Salisbury metropolitan area with the Cambridge, Maryland micropolitan statistical area including Dorchester County.

Counties
Dorchester County, Maryland (in CSA not MSA)
Somerset County, Maryland
Wicomico County, Maryland
Worcester County, Maryland
Sussex County, Delaware

Communities

Places with more than 20,000 inhabitants
Salisbury, Maryland (principal city)

Places with 5,000 to 20,000 inhabitants
Cambridge, Maryland (in CSA not MSA)
Georgetown, Delaware
Milford, Delaware (part)
Ocean City, Maryland
Ocean Pines, Maryland (census-designated place)
Seaford, Delaware

Places with 1,000 to 5,000 inhabitants
Algonquin, Maryland (census-designated place, in CSA not MSA)
Berlin, Maryland
Bethany Beach, Delaware
Blades, Delaware
Bridgeville, Delaware
Crisfield, Maryland 
Delmar, Delaware
Delmar, Maryland 
Fruitland, Maryland 
Hurlock, Maryland (in CSA not MSA)
Laurel, Delaware
Lewes, Delaware
Long Neck, Delaware (census-designated place)
Millsboro, Delaware
Milton, Delaware
Ocean View, Delaware
Pittsville, Maryland
Pocomoke City, Maryland 
Princess Anne, Maryland
Rehoboth Beach, Delaware
Selbyville, Delaware
Snow Hill, Maryland
West Ocean City, Maryland (census-designated place)

Places with 500 to 1,000 inhabitants
Dagsboro, Delaware
Deal Island, Maryland (census-designated place)
Eden, Maryland (census-designated place)
Fairmount, Maryland (census-designated place)
Frankford, Delaware
Greenwood, Delaware
Hebron, Maryland
Lincoln, Delaware  (census-designated place) 
Millville, Delaware
Mount Vernon, Maryland (census-designated place)
Secretary, Maryland (in CSA not MSA)
Sharptown, Maryland
Willards, Maryland

Places with less than 500 inhabitants
Allen, Maryland (census-designated place)
Bethel, Delaware
Bishopville, Maryland (census-designated place)
Bivalve, Maryland (census-designated place)
Brookview, Maryland (in CSA not MSA)
Chance, Maryland (census-designated place)
Church Creek, Maryland (in CSA not MSA)
Dames Quarter, Maryland (census-designated place)
Dewey Beach, Delaware
East New Market, Maryland (in CSA not MSA)
Eldorado, Maryland (in CSA not MSA)
Ellendale, Delaware
Elliott, Maryland (census-designated place, in CSA not MSA)
Fenwick Island, Delaware
Fishing Creek, Maryland (census-designated place, in CSA not MSA)
Frenchtown-Rumbly, Maryland (census-designated place)
Galestown, Maryland (in CSA not MSA)
Girdletree, Maryland (census-designated place)
Henlopen Acres, Delaware
Jesterville, Maryland (census-designated place)
Madison, Maryland (census-designated place, in CSA not MSA)
Mardela Springs, Maryland 
Nanticoke, Maryland (census-designated place)
Nanticoke Acres, Maryland (census-designated place)
Newark, Maryland (census-designated place)
Parsonsburg, Maryland (census-designated place)
Powellville, Maryland (census-designated place)
Quantico, Maryland (census-designated place)
Slaughter Beach, Delaware
Smith Island, Maryland (census-designated place)
South Bethany, Delaware
Stockton, Maryland (census-designated place)
Taylors Island, Maryland (census-designated place, in CSA not MSA)
Tyaskin, Maryland (census-designated place)
Vienna, Maryland (in CSA not MSA)
Waterview, Maryland (census-designated place)
West Pocomoke, Maryland (census-designated place)
Whaleyville, Maryland (census-designated place)
Whitehaven, Maryland (census-designated place)

History
Prior to the 2010 census, the Salisbury metropolitan area consisted only of Wicomico and Somerset counties in Maryland. As of the 2000 census, the MSA had a population of 109,391 (though a July 1, 2009 estimate placed the population at 120,181). Worcester County, Maryland was considered a part of the Ocean Pines Micropolitan Statistical Area and Sussex County, Delaware was considered a part of the Seaford Micropolitan Statistical Area. In 2018, the United States Census Bureau defined the Salisbury-Cambridge, MD-DE Combined Statistical Area, which combines the Salisbury metropolitan area with the Cambridge, Maryland Micropolitan Statistical Area (Dorchester County).

The Salisbury–Ocean Pines Combined Statistical Area consisted of the Salisbury metropolitan area and the Ocean Pines micropolitan area. As of the 2000 Census, the CSA had a population of 155,934 (though a July 1, 2009 estimate placed the population at 169,303).

Demographics
As of the 2000 census, of there were 109,931 people, 40,579 households, and 27,223 families residing within the MSA. The racial makeup of the MSA was 68.92% White, 27.32% African American, 0.25% Native American, 1.46% Asian, 0.02% Pacific Islander, 0.73% from other races, and 1.30% from two or more races. Hispanic or Latino of any race were 1.99% of the population.

The median income for a household in the area was $34,469, and the median income for a family was $42,386. Males had a median income of $29,989 versus $23,292 for females. The per capita income for the MSA was $17,568.

Transportation

Major highways

Airports
Salisbury–Ocean City–Wicomico Regional Airport
Bennett Airport
Crisfield Municipal Airport
Delaware Coastal Airport
Laurel Airport
Ocean City Municipal Airport

Mass transit
Shore Transit serves Somerset, Wicomico, and Worcester counties with local routes in Salisbury and commuter routes between cities and towns in the three counties.
DART First State serves Sussex County, Delaware with six year-round routes along with seasonal routes in the beach communities and inter-county service to other parts of Delaware.
Ocean City Transportation A Bus service in Ocean City with connections to Shore Transit and DART First State.

Colleges and universities
Delaware Technical Community College Jack F. Owens Campus
Salisbury University
University of Maryland Eastern Shore
Wor–Wic Community College

Media

Radio

Television

See also
Maryland census statistical areas
Delaware census statistical areas

References

 
Geography of Somerset County, Maryland
Geography of Sussex County, Delaware
Geography of Wicomico County, Maryland
Geography of Worcester County, Maryland
Northeast megalopolis